E. 1999 Eternal is the second studio album by American hip hop group Bone Thugs-N-Harmony, released July 25, 1995, on Ruthless Records. The album was released four months after the death of rapper Eazy-E, the group's mentor and the executive producer of the album. Both the album and single "Tha Crossroads" are dedicated to him. Following up on the surprise success of their breakthrough single "Thuggish Ruggish Bone", it became a popular album and received positive reviews from music critics, earning praise for the group's melodic rapping style. The album title is a portmanteau of Cleveland's eastside neighborhood centering on East 99th Street and St. Clair Avenue where the group is based and the then-future year 1999.

The album sold 307,000 copies in the first week. E. 1999 Eternal became the group's best-selling album, with four million copies sold in the United States. It topped the US Billboard 200 for two consecutive weeks. The album was nominated for the inaugural Grammy Award for Best Rap Album, ultimately losing to Naughty by Nature's Poverty's Paradise at the 1996 Grammy Awards. In 2015, the group toured in support of the 20th anniversary of the album, performing it in its entirety for the first time.

Reception

Upon release, E. 1999 Eternal was met with critical acclaim. Cheo H. Coker of the Los Angeles Times wrote that the group "has raised the stakes of the gangsta rap game, not only in terms of pure, gritty excess, but also in rhyme-style, cadence and delivery", concluding: "This is the kind of album that starts out good and gets better with repeated listenings—as the dark, subliminal references clear up. Easily one of the most worthwhile rap purchases of the year."

Retrospectively, Jason Birchmeier of AllMusic described E. 1999 Eternal as "an impressive debut full-length that dismisses any notion that the group was merely a one-hit wonder", adding that it "maintains a consistent tone, one that's menacing and somber, produced entirely by DJ U-Neek, a Los Angeles-based producer who frames the songs with dark, smoked-out G-funk beats and synth melodies." The Source hailed E. 1999 Eternal as one of The Top 100 Rap Albums of 1990s.

In a second thought review in Stylus Magazine, the album was described as "Lyrically speaking, Bone Thugs have much in common with countless mainstream rap acts. The themes running throughout E.1999 Eternal are familiar—drugs, violent crime and death make regular appearances. It's the manner in which the lyrics are framed and delivered that makes the group such a bizarre proposition. Bone Thugs had a melodic flow—frequently delivered in unison—that bordered on singing. They could rap together at a lightning fast pace, without losing their sweetness." Stylus also praised producer DJ U-Neek for his production style on the album stating "The album was entirely produced by DJ U-Neek (although he did collaborate on some tracks), endowing cohesiveness to the unique Bone Thugs sound. U-Neek was, like the vocal group members of Bone Thugs, unorthodox in the rap field. It wouldn't be far off to describe him as a songwriter as well as a producer. He was always keen to flesh out interesting sounds—usually based around rumbling piano chords, mellotron and synthesised strings. Yet, the focus was largely on song craft and melody—the album frequently strays into gloomy territory, but never loses its sense of tunefulness. The beats were not particularly striking—usually low-key and sluggish, but the album's strengths are not rhythm-related."

Track listing

Notes
 signifies a co-producer

Samples

Personnel
 Eric "Eazy-E" Wright - Executive Producer, Album Concept
 D.J. U-Neek - Producer, Recording
 Layzie Bone - Producer
 Anne Catalino - Engineer
 Aaron Connor - Engineer and Recording
 Don Cunningham - Design and Art Direction
 Tony Cowan - Recording
 Madeleine Smith - Sample Clearance

Charts

Weekly charts

Year-end charts

Decade-end charts

Certifications

References

External links
 E 1999 Eternal at Discogs
 "Back to the Lab" series - E 1999 Eternal at RapReviews

1995 albums
Bone Thugs-n-Harmony albums
Ruthless Records albums